The Dhammasaṅgaṇī (Pāli), also known as the Dhammasaṅgaha, is a Buddhist scripture, part of the Pali Canon of Theravada Buddhism. It is the first of the seven texts of the Abhidhamma Pitaka. 

The book begins with a matika (Pali for "matrix"), which is a list of classifications of dhammas, variously translated as ideas, phenomena, states, patterns etc. The text lacks a nidana, though the commentaries record that attempts were made at creating one that depicted the Buddha preaching the Abhidhamma in one of the heavenly realms. Theravada tradition attributes the Dhammasaṅgaṇī to Sariputra, who is held to have recited the Abhidhamma as part of the sutta texts at the First Buddhist Council, and regards it as one of the canonical teachings that Mahinda brought to Sri Lanka from the empire of Asoka. Its title is abbreviated 'Dhs' in Pāli scholarship.

Format
Following the matika, the main body of the book is in four parts, as follows.
 The first part deals with states of mind, listing and defining factors present in them.
 The second deals with material phenomena, classifying them numerically, by ones, twos etc.
 The third part applies the material in the first two to explaining the classifications in the matika.
 The fourth does likewise, but in a different and sometimes more detailed way, and omitting the sutta method 2-fold classifications. This fourth part is mostly omitted from the old translation, only a few extracts being included. The new translation is complete.

Rhys Davids (1900) divisions of the text are as follows:

Translations
Several English translations are available, including:
 The Dhammasangani, edited by Edward Müller, 1885, published for the Pali Text Society, by H. Frowde in London
 A Buddhist Manual of Psychological Ethics, tr C. A. F. Rhys Davids, Royal Asiatic Society, 1900; reprinted with corrections, Pali Text Society, Bristol
Dhammasaṅgaṇī: Enumeration of the Ultimate Realities, tr U Kyaw Khine, Department for the Promotion and Propagation of the Sasana, Rangoon, ?1996; reprinted by Sri Satguru Pubns, Delhi, 2 volumes

See also
 Atthasālinī

References

External links
 Books for sale of the Dhammasangani (HTML).

Abhidhamma Pitaka
Theravada Buddhist texts